Madhavaram is a village in Ponneri Taluk, Thiruvallur district in the state of Tamil Nadu in India.

Demographics

References 

Cities and towns in Tiruvallur district